Ken Nelson (born May 22, 1936) is a retired clergyman, politician, and veteran from Minnesota. He served in the Minnesota House of Representatives.

Early life and career
He was born in Grant County, Minnesota. He served with the United States Army in France from 1954 to 1956.

Political career
He represented District 59B to the state House from 1973 to 1982 and District 62A from 1983 to 1992.

Personal life
When elected, he was a member of Mount Olivet Lutheran Church and lived in Minneapolis. After being elected he married Susan, and had three children.

References

Members of the Minnesota House of Representatives
1936 births
Living people
People from Grant County, Minnesota
Military personnel from Minnesota